Peter Illing (4 March 1899 – 29 October 1966) was an Austrian-born British film and television actor.

Selected TV series
 The Four Just Men (1959) as Dr Mozek
 Deadline Midnight (1961) as Captain Dnieprovsky
 The Saint (1962) as Inspector Buono

Filmography
 The Silver Darlings (1947) – Foreign Buyer
 The End of the River (1947) – Ship's Agent
 Against the Wind (1948) – Andrew

 Eureka Stockade (1949) – Raffaello
 Floodtide (1949) – Senor Arandha
 The Huggetts Abroad (1949) – Algerian Detective
 Poet's Pub (1949) – Charles (uncredited)
 Madness of the Heart (1949) – Dr. Matthieu
 Children of Chance (1949)
 State Secret (1950) – Macco, the magician
 My Daughter Joy (1950) – Sultan
 Her Favourite Husband (1950) – Commissario Scaletti
 Traveller's Joy (1950) – Tilsen
 I'll Get You for This (1951) – Armando Ceralde
 Outcast of the Islands (1952) – Alagappan
 The Woman's Angle (1952) – Sergei
 24 Hours of a Woman's Life (1952) – M. Blanc
 Time Bomb (1953) – Carlo (uncredited)
 Never Let Me Go (1953) – N.K.V.D. Man
 Innocents in Paris (1953) – Panitov
 West of Zanzibar (1954) – Khingoni
 The House Across the Lake (1954) – Harry Stevens
 Flame and the Flesh (1954) – Peppe
 The Young Lovers (1954) – Dr. Weissbrod
 Svengali (1954) – Police Inspector
 Mask of Dust (1954) – Tony Bellario
 That Lady (1955) – Diego
 As Long as They're Happy (1955) – French Sergeant
 Born for Trouble (1955)
 Passport to Treason (1955) – Giorgio Sacchi
 It's Never Too Late (1956) – Guggenheimer
 Bhowani Junction (1956) – Ghanshyam
 Loser Takes All (1956) – Stranger
 The Battle of the River Plate (1956) – Dr. Guani – Foreign Minister, Uruguay
 Zarak (1956) – Ahmad
 Interpol (1957) – Capt. Baris
 Fire Down Below (1957) – Captain of Ulysses
 Manuela (1957) – Agent
 Miracle in Soho (1957) – Papa Gozzi
 Man in the Shadow (1957) – Carlo Raffone
 Campbell's Kingdom (1957) – The Doctor
 A Farewell to Arms (1957) – Milan Hotel Clerk (uncredited)
 Escapement (1958) – Paul Zakon
 I Accuse! (1958) – Georges Clemenceau
 The Angry Hills (1959) – Leonides
 Whirlpool (1959) – Braun
 Jet Storm (1959) – Gelderen
 Friends and Neighbours (1959) – Nikita
 The Wreck of the Mary Deare (1959) – Gunderson
 Operation Stogie (1959)
 Moment of Danger (1960) – Pawnbroker
 Bluebeard's Ten Honeymoons (1960) – Commissaire Lefevre
 Sands of the Desert (1960) – Sheikh Ibrahim
 The Secret Partner (1961) – Strakarios
 The Devil's Daffodil (1961) – Mr. (Jan) Putek
 The Happy Thieves (1961) – Mr. Pickett the Art Expert
 Middle Course (1961) – Gromik
 Village of Daughters (1962) – Alfredo Predati
 Nine Hours to Rama (1963) – Frank Ramamurti
 The V.I.P.s (1963) – Mr. Damer (uncredited)
 Echo of Diana (1963) – Kovali
 The Secret Door (1964) – Buergher
 Devils of Darkness (1965) – Inspector Malin
 Welcome, Mr. Beddoes (1966) – Zarik

References

External links
 

1899 births
1966 deaths
20th-century British male actors
Austrian emigrants to the United Kingdom
British male film actors
Emigrants from Austria after the Anschluss
Male actors from Vienna